Idol × Warrior Miracle Tunes! was originally broadcast from April 2, 2017, to March 25, 2018, on TV Tokyo and BS TV Tokyo. Episodes were also uploaded onto Takara Tomy's YouTube channel one week after its original broadcast date, with each new episode available to the public for up to one week.

Takashi Miike is the general director of the series. Additional staff members included Yoshitaka Yamaguchi, Takeshi Yokoi, Kenichiro Nishiumi, and Ryusuke Kurahashi as episode directors, with Hisako Fujihira, Kana Matsui, and Mao Aoki as the main writers for the show. The dances are choreographed by EXPG Studio.

Television ratings for Idol × Warrior Miracle Tunes! were low, averaging 1% in nationwide viewership and about 5-10% of viewers from the target audience. In addition, the official social media accounts had only 6,000 followers. However, it was considered a critical success and was credited as starting a "new genre" for shows aimed at the female toddler to primary school age demographic. The show was seen as a female counterpart to the Super Sentai series and focused on themes popular with the young female demographic, most notably Japanese idols. Sumiko Kodama from Confidence credits that the show's integration of J-pop elements in collaboration with LDH also made the presentation easy for audiences of all ages to enjoy, as Miracle²'s real-life debut would remind older audiences of Speed. Editors at Real Sound believe the popularity of Idol × Warrior Miracle Tunes! came from the revived interest in live-action tokusatsu shows aimed at a female audience, which had declined in the early 1990s due to competing toy sales with Sailor Moon and growing interest in magical girl anime series.

All theme songs were performed by Miracle², consisting of core cast members Asaka Uchida, Suzuka Adachi, Yuzuha Oda, Rina Usukura, and Mio Nishiyama performing as their characters. They are credited under the name . The opening theme songs to the show are "Catch Me!" from episodes 1–15; "Catch Me!

A documentary titled  aired on September 1, 2017, as a television special. The documentary contains behind-the-scenes footage on the show, including the main cast's auditions and dance rehearsals.

Episode list

Specials

Home media

Kadokawa released several region 2 DVDs for rental as the series was airing. After the show's end, the episodes were collected and released at major retailers as region 2 DVD sets, which also contained extras such as behind-the-scenes footage, press conferences, and events.

Rental

Box sets

References

2017 Japanese television seasons
2018 Japanese television seasons